Cercidospora stereocaulorum is a species of lichenicolous fungus in the genus Cercidospora but it has not been assigned to a family. It is known to parasitise lichens of the genus Stereocaulon.

Similar species
Cercidospora stereocaulorum is very similar to Cercidospora punctillata and Cercidospora decolorella but they can be told apart from their spore biology and their host species. Cercidospora punctillata grows on various lichens, most commonly Solorina crocea and species of Peltigera. while Cercidospora decolorella grows on mosses. Cercidospora alpina also grows on species of Stereocaulon and can therefore be confused with Cercidospora stereocaulorum.

Distribution
Cercidospora stereocaulorum has been reported from Alaska, Canada, Greenland, Iceland, Russia, including Wrangel Island and Svalbard.

Host species and symptoms
It grows on phyllocladia, stems and occasionally cephalodia and old apothecia of its host species. It can induce gall-like swellings up to 1.5 mm in diamerter and the infected host tissues can become pinkish or slightly bleached. Infection does not induce any other known symptoms.

Host species include:

 Stereocaulon alpinum
 Stereocaulon botryosum
 Stereocaulon depressum
 Stereocaulon glareosum
 Stereocaulon groenlandicum
 Stereocaulon intermedium
 Stereocaulon paschale
 Stereocaulon rivulorum
 Stereocaulon saxatile
 Stereocaulon subcoralloides
 Stereocaulon symphycheilum
 Stereocaulon vesuvianum

References

Dothideomycetes
Fungi described in 1987
Fungi of Canada
Fungi of the United States
Fungi of Russia
Fungi of Svalbard
Lichenicolous fungi
Taxa named by Ferdinand Christian Gustav Arnold